Bill Morton (September 17, 1909 – April 11, 1987) was an American football player.  He was elected to the College Football Hall of Fame in 1972.

1909 births
1987 deaths
Sportspeople from New Rochelle, New York
Dartmouth Big Green football players
College Football Hall of Fame inductees